Aldro Thompson Hibbard (August 25, 1886 – November 12, 1972) was an American plein air painter known for his depictions of snowy landscapes, particularly of Vermont. Hibbard worked in oil, as watercolor couldn't be used in January and February in the mountains of Vermont. He lived most of his life in Rockport, Massachusetts.

Early life
Hibbard was born in Falmouth, Massachusetts to James Thompson Hibbard and to the former Katherine Swift. Hibbard's father sold sewing machines and his mother was a homemaker who had a fondness of nature and spiritualism. He had one older sister, Adeline. Hibbard was raised in the Boston suburbs of Roxbury and Dorchester and graduated from Dorchester High School in 1906. Hibbard was captain of the baseball team at Dorchester High School. As a young man, he often spent summers visiting family in Falmouth, and in 1911, 1913, 1915, and 1916, he played baseball for the "Cottage Club", Falmouth's town team in what is now the Cape Cod Baseball League.

Hibbard enrolled in the Massachusetts Normal Art School which is now known as Massachusetts College of Art and Design (or MassArt) in 1906. Here he studied with Ernest Lee Major, Joseph DeCamp, Frederic Andrew Bosley all of whom were well known painters of portraits and still life. He worked his way through college, walking back and forth to Dorchester to attend classes six days a week and also attending night classes several times a week. He rarely arrived home before midnight. Due to his work ethic, Hibbard completed the four year normal art school program in three years and in 1909 enrolled at the school of Museum of Fine Arts, Boston (now known as School of the Museum of Fine Arts at Tufts) to continue his studies. Here he studied with Frank Weston Benson, Phillip Leslie Hale and Edmund Charles Tarbell who were instructors in the new school of American Impressionism at that time. Hibbard studied at the Museum of Fine Arts, Boston for an additional four years and upon graduation was awarded in 1913 with the Paige Traveling Scholarship, one of only four scholarships and the only American to receive the scholarship for this year. With the resources now to travel to Europe and study for two years, Hibbard departed Boston aboard the  bound for Cobh, Ireland in September 1913. Hibbard spent time in England, France, Spain, Morocco, and Italy. He was able to study and sketch from many masters and had exposure to the life of Europe. He explored both town and landscape venues. Due to the declaration of War 29 July 1914 (Italy), Hibbard made his way back to England there boarding the SS Arabic in November 1914 bound for Boston.

Career
The National Academy of Design awarded Hibbard the 1922 First Hallgarten Prize for Late February, and the 1928 Second Altman Prize for Snow Mantle.

Hibbard traveled extensively early in his career across the United States and Canada seeking mountainous venues. He then gravitated to Rockport where many artists coalesced to form what is now known as the Rockport Art Association, including Charles R. Knapp and Harry Aiken Vincent. Hibbard was president of the association for over 20 years. He also was an instructor for many years creating the Hibbard School of Painting in Rockport. He spent his summers instructing in Rockport and then painting in Vermont in the winter months.

Hibbard was a member of many American art organizations, including the Rockport Art Association and the North Shore Art Association. He was a National Academician of the National Academy of Design granted Associate National Academician in 1923 and National Academician in 1933.

Legacy
Hibbard influenced Rockport artists including Emile Gruppe, Tom Nicholas, Paul Strisik, Marguerite Stuber Pearson, and Roger Curtis.

His paintings, which are associated with the Boston School of painting, are in many museums including the Museum of Fine Arts Boston, Currier Museum of Art, Portland Museum of Art, Whistler House Museum of Art, corporations and other prominent private collections.

Aldro Hibbard's current record at auction occurred on February 3, 2012 at Skinner Auctioneers and Appraisers, when Winter in New England, Probably a West River, Vermont View, estimated at $25,000-$35,000, sold for $88,875. Along with Anthony Thieme, Hibbard is generally regarded as the most expensive Rockport painter at auction.

References

Sources
A.T. Hibbard, N.A.: Artist in Two Worlds, by John L. Cooley, published 1968.
Rockport Sketchbook, by John L. Cooley, published 1965.
"Aldro T. Hibbard, Painter of New England Winters", American Artist, June 1940.
"The Legacy of Cape Ann," by James Keny, American Art Review, Oct./Nov. 1995.
"A New View of Aldro Hibbard", by Charles Movalli, American Artist, May 1979.
Art For All, The Cape Ann School, by Lisa B. Martin.
The Inspiration of Cape Ann, by Tom Davies, Rockport Art Association, 1993.
Gloucester, Views of the Art Colony by American Masters, by R.H. Love, R.H. Love Galleries, Oct./Nov. 1991

External links
Aldro Hibbard essay

1886 births
1972 deaths
People from Falmouth, Massachusetts
Massachusetts College of Art and Design alumni
Falmouth Commodores players
Cape Cod Baseball League players (pre-modern era)
20th-century American painters
American male painters
Boston School (painting)
20th-century American male artists